Sibandarreh (also Romanized as Sībāndarreh) is a village in Baraghan Rural District, Chendar District, Savojbolagh County, Alborz Province, Iran. According to 2006 census, its population was 72, in 27 families.

References 

Populated places in Savojbolagh County